Alexander Findlay Lindsay (8 November 1896 – 9 December 1971) was a professional footballer who played for Raith Rovers, Tottenham Hotspur, Thames and Dundee.

Football career 
Born in Dundee, Lindsay joined Tottenham Hotspur from Raith Rovers in 1919 (he had only played one season of Scottish Football League fixtures with the Kirkcaldy club, with the absence due to commitments relating to World War I). The centre forward played a total of 224 matches and scored on 48 occasions in all competitions for the Lilywhites. He joined Thames in 1930 where he completed a further 25 games, netting a solitary goal. Lindsay ended his football career at Dundee.

References 

1896 births
1971 deaths
Footballers from Dundee
Scottish footballers
Scottish Junior Football Association players
Scottish Football League players
English Football League players
Dundee Violet F.C. players
Raith Rovers F.C. players
Tottenham Hotspur F.C. players
Dundee F.C. players
Association football forwards
Thames A.F.C. players